Sirindhornia is the scientific name of two genera of organisms and may refer to:

Sirindhornia (moth), a genus of insects in the family Tortricidae
Sirindhornia (plant), a genus of plants in the family Orchidaceae